Jacob Rooksby is the dean of the Gonzaga University School of Law, assuming the role in 2018. He previously served as an associate dean of administration and associate professor of law at Duquesne University School of Law in  Pittsburgh, Pennsylvania. Rooskby also worked in the private sector before entering academia, as an attorney at McGuireWoods, LLP and Cohen & Grigsby.

Early life and career
Rooksby is a graduate of the College of William and Mary and University of Virginia. He earned a Master of Education, Juris Doctor, and Ph.D. at University of Virginia (and University of Virginia School of Law). His academic writing has appeared in multiple scholarly law journals including the Harvard Journal of Law & Technology and the Yale Journal of Law and Technology.

Rooksby received the Dr. John and Liz Murray Award for Excellence in Faculty Scholarship at Duquesne University School of Law, its highest faculty honor.  He is a past president of the Pittsburgh Intellectual Property Law Association and listed among Pittsburgh's 40 Under 40 Honorees. Rooksby's research has focused on issues of intellectual property law and higher education law.  He is also a member of the American Law Institute.

Published works

References

Living people
University of Virginia School of Law alumni
Deans of law schools in the United States
Year of birth missing (living people)